The Sign of the Four (1890), also called The Sign of Four, is the second novel featuring Sherlock Holmes by British writer Sir Arthur Conan Doyle. Doyle wrote four novels and 56 short stories featuring the fictional detective.

Plot
On a foggy day in 1888, Dr. Watson remonstrates with Holmes about his cocaine usage. Holmes claims he needs a problem to solve and is bored; shortly thereafter, Miss Mary Morstan arrives with a case. 

Miss Morstan explains that, in December 1878, her father, Captain Arthur Morstan, had arrived in London, on leave from his post as a convict guard in the Andaman Islands. He requested her to meet him at the Langham Hotel, but he was not there when she arrived. Mary contacted Major John Sholto, a former convict guard who had known her father and was now living in England; however, he denied having seen Morstan, and Morstan was never heard from again. Four years later, Miss Morstan answered an anonymous newspaper advertisement, asking for her whereabouts. She then received a large and valuable pearl in the post, a gift repeated once a year for six years. With the sixth pearl, she received a letter asking for a meeting, claiming she has been "wronged". Holmes takes the case, and soon discovers that Major Sholto had died in 1882; within a week of his death, Mary received the first pearl. The only further clue Mary can give Holmes is a map of a fortress found in her father's desk, appended with the words "The Sign of the Four: Jonathan Small, Mahomet Singh, Abdullah Khan, and Dost Akbar".

Holmes, Watson, and Mary meet with Major Sholto's son Thaddeus, the anonymous sender of the pearls. Thaddeus explains that Morstan had visited Major Sholto, to demand his half of a great treasure that Sholto had secretly brought back from India. The two men quarreled, and Captain Morstan suffered a heart attack and died, striking his head on the brazen treasure box as he fell. Afraid he would be suspected of murder, Major Sholto buried the body and hid the treasure, leaving out a small gold chaplet studded with twelve pearls. Thaddeus and his twin brother Bartholomew knew nothing of these events, until an unexpected letter from India caused their father to faint, and sicken to his death. On his deathbed, he confessed the truth to them; he was about to reveal to them where the treasure was hidden, when a bearded man appeared at the window and the Major died of sheer fright. The man fled, but the brothers later found a note reading "The Sign of the Four" pinned to their dead father's body. Thaddeus began sending Mary the pearls to make things right, and the brothers searched for the treasure. Six years later, Bartholomew found and withheld it; Thaddeus has contacted Mary so they can both confront Bartholomew and demand their shares.

The party heads to Bartholomew's house, Pondicherry Lodge, only to find that he is dead from a poisoned dart, and the treasure is missing. While the police wrongly take Thaddeus in as a suspect, Holmes deduces from several clues that there are two persons involved in the murder: a one-legged white man named Jonathan Small, and a very small, tribal Andamanese accomplice. Borrowing Toby, a trained scent hound, from a naturalist, Holmes traces the pair to a boat landing. Learning Small has hired a steam launch named the Aurora, Holmes, with the help of the Baker Street Irregulars and his own disguises, traces the boat to a repair yard. In a police launch, Holmes and Watson pursue the Aurora when it flees the yard; the islander attempts to shoot a dart at Holmes, and is shot dead himself. Small attempts to flee, running the Aurora aground, but is captured. However, the brass box is empty; Small, not wanting to surrender the gems, scattered them overboard into the Thames.

Small confesses that he was once a soldier of the Third Buffs in India, and lost his right leg to a crocodile while bathing in the Ganges. He then became an overseer on an indigo plantation; the 1857 rebellion occurred, and he was forced to flee to the Agra fortress. While standing guard one night, he was overpowered by some Sikh troopers, who gave him a choice; be immediately killed, or help them waylay Achmed, a disguised servant of an outlawed rajah, who had sent Achmed with a box of jewelry to the British for safekeeping. The robbery and murder took place, but the crime was discovered, although the hidden jewels were not. Small and his accomplices got penal servitude on the Andaman Islands.

Many years later, Small learned that Major Sholto and Captain Morstan had lost much money at cards. Small saw his chance, and made a deal with the officers; Sholto would recover the treasure, and in return send a boat to pick up Morstan, Small and the Sikhs so they could all meet and divide it. However, Sholto stole the treasure for himself, returning to England after inheriting a fortune from his uncle. Morstan went after Sholto but never returned, and Small vowed vengeance against Sholto. Four years later, Small escaped prison with the help of an islander named Tonga, whose life Small had once saved. It was the news of this escape that shocked Sholto into his fatal illness. Small arrived too late to hear of the treasure's location, but left the note in the room anyway. When Bartholomew found the treasure, Small only planned to steal it; however, a miscommunication led Tonga to kill Bartholomew before Small could stop him. Small decides the treasure brings nothing but bad luck to anyone who has it; to Achmed and Bartholomew, death; to Major Sholto, fear and guilt; and for Small himself, penal servitude for life. 

Mary is left with no treasure, save the pearls; however, she and Watson have fallen in love over the course of the adventure. Watson reveals to Holmes that he has proposed to her and that she has accepted, much to Holmes' annoyance.

Publication history 

Sir Arthur Conan Doyle described how he was commissioned to write the story over a dinner with Joseph Marshall Stoddart, managing editor of the American publication Lippincott's Monthly Magazine, at the Langham Hotel in London on 30 August 1889. Stoddart wanted to produce an English version of Lippincott’s with a British editor and British contributors. The dinner was also attended by Oscar Wilde, who eventually contributed The Picture of Dorian Gray to the July 1890 issue.  Doyle discussed what he called this "golden evening" in his 1924 autobiography Memories and Adventures.

The novel first appeared in the February 1890 edition of Lippincott's Monthly Magazine as The Sign of the Four; or The Problem of the Sholtos, appearing in both London and Philadelphia. The British edition of the magazine originally sold for a shilling, and the American for 25 cents. Surviving copies are now worth several thousand dollars.

Over the following few months in the same year, the novel was then republished in several regional British journals. These re-serialisations gave the title as The Sign of Four. The novel was published in book form in October 1890 by Spencer Blackett, again using the title The Sign of Four. This edition included a frontispiece illustrated by Charles H. M. Kerr. The title of both the British and American editions of this first book edition omitted the second "the" of the original title.

A German edition of the book published in 1902 was illustrated by Richard Gutschmidt. An edition published by George Newnes Ltd in 1903 was illustrated by F. H. Townsend.

Different editions over the years have varied between the two forms of the title, with most editions favouring the four-word form. The actual text in the novel nearly always uses "the Sign of the Four" (the five-word form) to describe the symbol in the story, although the four-word form is used twice by Jonathan Small in his narrative at the end of the story.

As with the first story, A Study in Scarlet, produced two years previously, The Sign of the Four was not particularly successful to start with. It was the short stories, published from 1891 onwards in Strand Magazine, that made household names of Sherlock Holmes and his creator.

Adaptations

Television and film
There have been multiple film and television adaptations of the book:

Radio

A radio adaptation of the story was broadcast on New York radio station WGY on 9 November 1922. The cast included Edward H. Smith as Sherlock Holmes, F. H. Oliver as Dr. Watson, and Viola Karwowska as Mary Morstan. It was produced as part of a series of adaptations of plays, so it is likely that the script was based on an existing stage adaptation of the story (one was written by John Arthur Fraser in 1901 and another by Charles P. Rice in 1903).

A six-part adaptation of the novel aired in the radio series The Adventures of Sherlock Holmes. Adapted by Edith Meiser, the episodes aired from 9 November 1932 to 14 December 1932, with Richard Gordon as Sherlock Holmes and Leigh Lovell as Dr. Watson.

The book was adapted by Felix Felton for the BBC Light Programme in 1959. Richard Hurndall played Holmes and Bryan Coleman played Watson.

In 1963, the story was dramatised by Michael Hardwick for the BBC Home Service as part of the 1952–1969 radio series, with Carleton Hobbs as Holmes and Norman Shelley as Watson.

CBS Radio Mystery Theater aired a radio version of the story in 1977, starring Kevin McCarthy as Holmes and Court Benson as Watson.

The Sign of the Four was adapted for radio by Bert Coules in 1989 as part of BBC Radio 4's complete Sherlock Holmes 1989–1998 radio series, with Clive Merrison as Holmes, Michael Williams as Watson, and featuring Brian Blessed as Jonathan Small.

In 2016, the story was adapted as an episode of the American radio series The Classic Adventures of Sherlock Holmes, with John Patrick Lowrie as Holmes and Lawrence Albert as Watson.

Stage
Paul Giovanni's 1978 play The Crucifer of Blood is based on the novel. The Broadway premiere featured Paxton Whitehead as Holmes and Timothy Landfield as Watson. The 1979 London production featured Keith Michell as Holmes and Denis Lill as Watson.

References

External links

 
 
 
 

1890 British novels
Sherlock Holmes novels by Arthur Conan Doyle
History of the Andaman and Nicobar Islands
Novels about the Indian Rebellion of 1857
Fiction set in 1888
Novels set in the 1880s
Victorian novels
Works originally published in Lippincott's Monthly Magazine
Epistolary novels
Treasure troves
Dogs in literature
British novels adapted into films
British novels adapted into plays
Novels adapted into radio programs
British novels adapted into television shows